JCSAT-110, also known as N-SAT 110, JCSAT-7, Superbird-5 and Superbird-D, is a Japanese geostationary communications satellite which was operated by JSAT Corporation and Space Communications Corporation until both companies merged into SKY Perfect JSAT Group in 2008. It is positioned in geostationary orbit at a longitude of 110° East, from where it is used to provide communications services to Japan.

Satellite description 
The spacecraft was designed and manufactured by Lockheed Martin on the A2100-AX satellite bus. As most satellites based on the A2100-AX platform, it uses a  LEROS-1C liquid apogee engine (LAE) for orbit raising.

Its dual wing solar panels gave a power generation capability of 8.3 kW at the end of its design life, with a span of  when deployed.

Its payload is composed of twenty-four 36 MHz Ku-band transponders with a TWTA output power of 120 watts per channel. With its total bandwidth of 864 GHz, it is used primarily for multi-channel pay per view business.

History 
In September 1997, both JCSAT and Space Communications Corporation (SCC) had requested the 110° East position. The Japanese government made both companies share the 110° East position, and thus they both made a joint order on 20 November 1998 for N-SAT 110 from Lockheed Martin. JCSAT used the JCSAT-7 designation for this satellite, while SCC used Superbird-5.

On 6 October 2000 at 23:00 UTC, an Ariane-42L H10-3 successfully launched N-SAT 110 to a geostationary transfer orbit from Centre Spatial Guyanais ELA-2. One hour later, at 00:04 UTC, on 7 October 2000, the first signals from the satellite were successfully received from the Australia ground station. On 14 October 2000, at around 03:00 UTC, N-SAT 110 reached the geostationary orbit. Once it was put into orbit, it was renamed as JCSAT-110 by JCSAT and Superbird-D by SCC.

On 1 October 2008, JSAT Corporation and Space Communications Corporation merged into SKY Perfect JSAT Group, and the satellite was known simply as JCSAT-110.

See also 

 2000 in spaceflight

References 

Communications satellites of Japan
Spacecraft launched in 2000
Satellites using the A2100 bus
2000 in Japan